Vogue Knitting, also known as Vogue Knitting International, is a magazine about knitting published by SoHo Publishing LLC. It is published biannually and includes knitting designs, yarn reviews, and interviews with designers.  Vogue International Knitting is a registered trademark of Advance Publications Inc. and is used under a license.

Originally launched in 1932 by Conde Nast, the magazine shuttered in 1969. It was relaunched in 1982 by the Butterick Company, who had purchased Vogue Patterns. Publisher and marketing director, Art Joinnides, saw the market potential for a knitting title. Since the Winter 2020/2021 issue, the magazine is edited by Norah Gaughan, and has its headquarters in New York. NY.

Events 
The editors of Vogue Knitting launched Vogue Knitting Live in 2011, a fan convention.  It takes place primarily in New York and Seattle. Classes, demonstrations and vendor marketplace are held as part of the convention, along with a fashion show.  Currently the events are held virtually due to Covid-19 restrictions

Vogue Knitting offers tours with travel opportunities. Their tours allow knitters to experience travel with benefits of workshops, guest speakers, specialty yarn shopping experiences, and excursions to textile manufactures, mills and more.

Digital Media 

 Vogue Knitting Knitterviews Podcasts
 Vogue Knitting Magazine App

Notable Contributors 

 Debbie Bliss
 Nicky Epstein
 Norah Gaughan
 Alice Starmore
Meg Swansen
 Stephen West

Books 
Vogue Knitting: The Ultimate Knitting Book.  New York. Sixth & Spring Books. 2018

References

External links
 Official website

Women's magazines published in the United States
Quarterly magazines published in the United States
Arts and crafts magazines
Magazines established in 1932
1932 establishments in Florida
Knitting